Mount Kenya sentinel chameleon or Mt Kenya hornless chameleon (Kinyongia excubitor) is a species of chameleons endemic to Kenya. It is known from Mount Kenya, Nyambeni Hills, and Aberdare Range.

References

Kinyongia
Reptiles of Kenya
Endemic fauna of Kenya
Taxa named by Thomas Barbour
Reptiles described in 1911